The 1901–02 Cornell men's ice hockey season was the 3rd season of play for the program.

Season
After a successful first foray in 1901 Cornell ran into an obstacle in its second season of ice hockey. The issue was the lack of available ice, a problem they shared by most other colleges at the time. While Brown, Harvard, Princeton and Yale were able to secure ice time at the St. Nicholas Rink, one of the only consistently available rinks at the time, Cornell found themselves frozen out most of the time.

As a result Cornell would play only a single game in 1902.

Note: Cornell University did not formally adopt 'Big Red' as its moniker until after 1905. They have been, however, associated with 'Carnelian and White' since the school's Inauguration Day on October 7, 1868.

Roster

Standings

Schedule and Results

|-
!colspan=12 style=";" | Regular Season

References

Cornell Big Red men's ice hockey seasons
Cornell
Cornell
Cornell
Cornell